The Battle of Soncino was a battle of the Wars in Lombardy, fought in March 1431. It was fought between the armies of the Republic of Venice, under Count of Carmagnola, and of the Duchy of Milan, under Francesco I Sforza.

The Milanese victoriously ambushed the Venetians, and captured 1,500 cavalry and 500 infantry.

See also
Battle of Pavia (1431)

External links
Page at Condottieri di ventura 

1431 in Europe
1430s in the Holy Roman Empire
15th century in the Republic of Venice
Soncino
Soncino
Soncino